Tessaria is a genus of South American plants in the tribe Inuleae within the family Asteraceae.

 Species
 Tessaria absinthioides (Hook. & Arn.) DC. - Brazil, Argentina, Chile, Paraguay, Uruguay
 Tessaria fastigiata (Griseb.) Cabrera - Bolivia, Paraguay, Argentina
 Tessaria integrifolia Ruiz & Pav. - Panamá, Colombia, Venezuela, Ecuador, Peru, Bolivia, Brazil, Paraguay
 formerly included
several species now considered members of Pluchea or Pterocaulon

References

Inuleae
Asteraceae genera
Flora of South America